Garrett Camp (born October 4, 1978) is a Canadian billionaire entrepreneur. He has helped build a series of companies, including founding StumbleUpon, a web-discovery tool; co-founding Uber; and founding Expa, a startup studio. Camp is chairman of Mix, the successor to StumbleUpon, and served on the board of directors of Uber until 2020.

Early life and education 
Camp was born and raised in Calgary, Alberta, Canada. His father was an economist, and his mother an artist, and both later became home builders. He graduated from the University of Calgary with a bachelor's degree in electrical engineering in 2001, and later earned a master's degree in software engineering, researching collaborative systems, evolutionary algorithms and information retrieval.

Career

StumbleUpon

Camp co-founded StumbleUpon in 2002. It was the first web-discovery platform and personalized recommendation engine. The service enabled users to discover web content with a single click, during the Web 2.0 era. In 2006, StumbleUpon relocated to San Francisco, after receiving its first round of funding from Silicon Valley angel investors. In 2007, StumbleUpon was included on the Time magazine's "50 Best Websites" list, and on its 2013 "50 Must-Have iPad Apps" list.

StumbleUpon was acquired by eBay for $75M in 2007 and spun-out in 2009, becoming an independent company again. Following its spin-off, Camp worked to expand its offerings to include mobile phone app discovery and social networking. He grew the company to over one hundred employees and over 25 million registered users as its founding CEO before stepping down in mid 2012 to work on other ventures. In August 2015, he acquired it again, after resetting all previous shareholders at $0/share. The platform continued to have standalone web and mobile apps until mid 2018, when its users were transitioned to the Mix.com, a venture built in part through Camp's studio startup company, Expa.

Uber
Camp founded Uber as UberCab in early 2009 while he was CEO of StumbleUpon, and self-funded the seed round of $250K.

Uber launched in San Francisco in mid 2010 with just a few cars on the road and, in late 2010, raised $1.25M in venture capital. In 2011, the company continued to expand across the United States and abroad, including major markets such as New York City and Paris. Uber's motto is "Everyone's Private Driver" and, in mid-2012, launched UberX and Uber SUV to offer customers low cost options and more vehicle choices. In late 2012, Uber launched UberTAXI, allowing taxi drivers to use the application with taxi-like fares for customers, and, in early 2013, CEO Travis Kalanick announced that Uber would begin offering a ride-sharing service, allowing community drivers to use the application.

Uber was listed in Forbes Top 10 Companies of 2012, and was ranked number 6 in Fast Company Most Innovative Companies of 2013. Uber is based in San Francisco, and has expanded in the US and abroad, offering service in over 600 cities worldwide.

In 2020, Camp announced that he was exiting the board of directors but would remain a board observer at the company.

Camp is portrayed by actor Jon Bass in Super Pumped, a 2022 drama series based on Uber.

Expa
Camp formed Expa in 2013, integrating his ten years of start-up experience into a system for building new companies. Expa is a startup studio to create and launch new companies by providing early-stage startups with starting capital, a workspace, and technical advice. Companies that partner with Expa work from offices in San Francisco, Los Angeles, New York, Vancouver or, most recently, London.

In March 2014, Expa raised its first $50 million from investors to fund the design and development of new companies.   In March 2016, Expa raised an additional $100 million to fund the creation of new startups. Expa has helped to build and launch a number of companies, including Mix.com, Haus.com and Cmd.com, among others.

On April 29, 2020, Expa announced that David Clark would join the company as its European partner to set up a new headquarters in London.

Eco
Camp is currently working on a cryptocurrency he calls Eco. Camp is striving to make it a digital global currency that facilitates daily transactions between business as a form of payment in order to improve commonly occurring issues with digital currencies. Eco also aims to be the most energy efficient currency in terms of transaction verification and token generation.

Investments
Previously, Camp invested in Prism Skylabs; SoundTracking; WillCall; PSDept; and BlackJet, an on-demand private aviation service.

Awards and honors
Camp was named to the TR35 List of Top Innovators under the age of 35 at Technology Review's Emerging Technologies Conference at MIT in 2007. In 2008 Camp was named by Bloomberg Businessweek as one of Tech's Best Young Entrepreneurs. Camp was honored at the 2013 Tribeca Disruptive Innovation Awards for his accomplishments at both StumbleUpon and Uber.

Wealth
In 2015, he was the 283rd-richest person in the world and the third-richest Canadian, with an estimated wealth of US$5.3 billion according to Forbes. As of November 2022, Camp's net worth is calculated at US$2.7 billion according to Forbes.

Allegations of exploitation
In June 2019, Camp bought a newly built, 11,000-square-foot mansion in Trousdale Estates of Beverly Hills for $72.5 million. Camp's purchase drew the ire of activists and Uber drivers, who protested the firm's labor practices and advocated for better working conditions for drivers. Karim Bayumi, a Los Angeles Uber driver and labor organizer, said "this guy is buying lavish houses with our money, our hard-earned money that they are unjustly taking from us."

Philanthropy
Camp has joined The Giving Pledge, a commitment to give away half of his wealth to charity.  In a personal blog post announcing his plans, Camp spoke of recent travels to Kenya, where he connected with people living without access to basic services like clean water, food and electricity. In 2018 Camp established the Camp Foundation, a non-profit research organization to support research into infrastructure, sustainability, and conservation projects that will have a significant global impact.

Personal life
Camp lives in San Francisco.

References

External links

 

1978 births
Living people
21st-century Canadian businesspeople
Businesspeople from Calgary
Businesspeople from the San Francisco Bay Area
Businesspeople in software
Canadian billionaires
Canadian chief executives
Canadian computer businesspeople
Canadian chairpersons of corporations
Canadian expatriates in the United States
Canadian investors
Canadian technology company founders
Directors of Uber
University of Calgary alumni
Giving Pledgers
21st-century philanthropists